Gyrinal is an organic chemical compound  - an unsaturated ketoaldehyde - with the formula C14H18O3, obtained from the whirligig beetle (the water boatman, Gyrinus natator). It is a powerful antiseptic and fish and mammal toxin, and thus used as a defensive compound. Typically the beetles contain approx. 80 microgram of the compound. The LD50 of the compound is approx. 45 mg/kg in mice.

References

Aldehydes
Enones
Sesquiterpenes
Alkene derivatives